Acquerello is a Michelin Guide-starred Italian restaurant in San Francisco, in the U.S. state of California.

Acquerello, the Italian word for watercolor.  Executive chef Suzette Gresham is also a co-owner.

See also 

 List of Italian restaurants
 List of Michelin starred restaurants in San Francisco Bay Area

References 

Restaurants in San Francisco
Italian restaurants in California
Michelin Guide starred restaurants in California